Cryptanthus sinuosus is a plant species in the genus Cryptanthus. This plant is endemic to the Brazilian state of Rio de Janeiro where it lives in coastal rain forests and sandy coastal plains.

Cultivars 
 Cryptanthus 'Big Brown'
 Cryptanthus 'Bob Whitman'
 Cryptanthus 'Bravo'
 Cryptanthus 'Cascade'
 Cryptanthus 'Cheers'
 Cryptanthus 'Earth Angel'
 Cryptanthus 'Gay Affair'
 Cryptanthus 'Georgia Waggoner'
 Cryptanthus 'Green Fields'
 Cryptanthus 'Hello Dolly'
 Cryptanthus 'Imposter Red'
 Cryptanthus 'Pink Floyd'
 Cryptanthus 'Pink To Green'
 Cryptanthus 'Red Cabbage'
 Cryptanthus 'Red Edge'
 Cryptanthus 'Road To Buzios'
 Cryptanthus 'Shining Red'
 Cryptanthus 'Silver Touch'
 Cryptanthus 'Soft Shadows'
 Cryptanthus 'Southern Star'
 Cryptanthus 'Spic 'N Span'
 Cryptanthus 'Undulatus'
 Cryptanthus 'Waterfall'
 Cryptanthus 'White Lace'

References 
BSI Cultivar Registry Retrieved 11 October 2009
Biodiversity and Conservation 11: 1081–1089, 2002

Flora of Brazil
sinuosus